Nationality words link to articles with information on the nation's poetry or literature (for instance, Irish or France).

Events
 Scottish poet Arthur Johnston goes to Italy to study medicine at Padua.

Works
 Henry Peacham the younger, The More the Merrier: Containing: threescore and odde haad-lesse epigrams
 Samuel Rowlands, Humors Looking Glasse
 Robert Tofte, Ariosto's Satyres (authorship is claimed by Tofte in The Blazon of Jealousie (1615) although Gervase Markham's name is on the title page)

Births
 June – Sir Richard Fanshawe (died 1666), English diplomat, translator, and poet
 December 8 – Vendela Skytte (died 1629), Swedish poet and lady of letters
 December 9 – John Milton (died 1674), English poet and writer
 December 20 (bapt.) – Sir Aston Cokayne (died 1684), English poet and playwright
 Also:
 Menahem Lonzano (born unknown), Palestinian Masoretic and midrashic scholar, lexicographer and poet
 Vaman Pandit (died 1695), Marathi scholar and poet of India
 Samarth Ramdas (died 1681), Marathi saint and religious poet
 Tukaram (died 1650), Sant (Saint) and spiritual poet during a Bhakti movement
 Chen Zilong (died 1647), Chinese poet of the Tang School

Deaths
 February 16 – Nicolas Rapin (born 1535), French magistrate, royal officer, translator, poet and satirist
 February 26 – Sir Thomas Craig (born c. 1538), Scottish jurist and poet
 April 19 – Thomas Sackville, 1st Earl of Dorset (born 1536), English statesman and poet
 July 26 – Pablo de Céspedes (born 1538), Spanish painter, poet and architect
 September – Mary Shakespeare, née Arden (born c. 1537), mother of English poet and dramatist William Shakespeare
 October 26 – Philipp Nicolai (born 1556), German poet and composer
Also:
 George Bannatyne (born 1545), Scottish collector of poems
 Henry Lok (born c. 1553), English
 Nicolas de Montreux (born c 1561), French nobleman, novelist, poet, translator and dramatist
 Jean Vauquelin de la Fresnaye (born 1536), French
 Andrzej Zbylitowski (born 1565), Polish

Notes

17th-century poetry
Poetry